Katherine C. Harkay is an American physicist working on particle accelerators.

Biography 
Harkey completed her bachelor's degree in Physics at St. John's University in 1982, then her master's degree at Purdue University in 1984.

Harkay obtained her PhD in Physics at Purdue University in 1993, supervised by Lazslo Gutay.

She now works at the Argonne National Laboratory on the Advanced Photon Source.

Awards and honours 
 2009 – Outstanding Alumni Award from Purdue University
 2013 – Fellow of the American Physical Society for "significant contributions to the understanding of the physics of electron cloud effects and the experimental investigation and understanding of collective effects, as well as for playing leading roles in development of photocathodes and superconducting undulator technology."

Selected publications

References

External links 
 

American women physicists
Living people
Purdue University alumni
Argonne National Laboratory people
Particle physicists
Year of birth missing (living people)
20th-century American physicists
20th-century American women scientists
21st-century American physicists
21st-century American women scientists
Fellows of the American Physical Society